The Cheesecake Factory Incorporated is an American restaurant company and distributor of cheesecakes based in the United States. The company operates 219 full-service restaurants: 206 under The Cheesecake Factory brand and 13 under the Grand Lux Cafe brand, not including the number of restaurants operated under the North Italia nor any of Fox Restaurant Brands' names. The Cheesecake Factory also operates two bakery production facilities—in Calabasas, California, and Rocky Mount, North Carolina—and licenses two bakery-based menus for other food service operators under The Cheesecake Factory Bakery Cafe marque. Its cheesecakes and other baked goods can also be found in the cafes of many Barnes & Noble stores.

David M. Overton, the company's founder, opened the first Cheesecake Factory restaurant in Beverly Hills, California, in 1978. The restaurant established the future chain's pattern of featuring an eclectic menu, large portions, and signature cheesecakes. In 2020, Fortune magazine ranked The Cheesecake Factory at number 12 on their Fortune List of the Top 100 Companies to Work For in 2020 based on an employee survey of satisfaction.

History

Founding and early years
Evelyn Overton opened a business after making a cheesecake for her husband's employer in 1949. She opened a small cheesecake bakery in Detroit, Michigan, in the late 1950s, but eventually gave it up in order to raise her two children. She continued to supply cakes to several local restaurants through a kitchen in her basement. In 1967, Evelyn's son David M. Overton left Detroit to attend Hastings College of Law in San Francisco, but in 1968, decided to be a drummer, performing with the Billy Roberts Blues Band. In 1971, David convinced his parents to relocate to Los Angeles to open a commercial bakery. In 1972, they moved to the Woodland Hills area of Los Angeles where they opened The Cheesecake Factory Bakery, in which they produced cheesecakes and other desserts for local restaurants.

California
In 1978, Evelyn's son David opened The Cheesecake Factory, a small salad-and-sandwich restaurant in Beverly Hills that sold 10 varieties of cheesecakes on a one-page menu. In 1983, he opened a second restaurant in Marina del Rey. By 1987, the Beverly Hills location had expanded into a 78-seat restaurant and was experiencing great financial success. This led to the opening of a third, larger location in Redondo Beach, which was eventually renovated into a 300-seat,  location. By the end of the 1980s, The Cheesecake Factory's one-page menu had expanded and the restaurant offered additional fast-food and short-order items.

Expansion beyond Southern California

The 1990s saw the opening of the first Cheesecake Factory restaurant outside of Southern California. The new restaurant was located in Washington, D.C. The Cheesecake Factory was incorporated in 1992 and went public in September 1993. David Overton planned to open 3–4 units a year in the hopes of generating 25% a year increase in sales.

The company began changing its menu twice a year and added items including steaks, seafood, and vegetarian dishes. The company continued to open new restaurants and by 1995 was ranked 11th in the United States. As of April 2013, The Cheesecake Factory operated 162 restaurants under The Cheesecake Factory name in 36 states. Plaza Las Américas in San Juan, Puerto Rico, opened its first Cheesecake Factory on August 28, 2013.

The company used to operate one self-service, limited-menu express food service operation under The Cheesecake Factory marque inside DisneyQuest at Disney Springs in Walt Disney World Resort in Lake Buena Vista, Florida. was opened in 1998 and it was closed in 2017.

International expansion

The Cheesecake Factory has expanded into international markets by both licensing agreements for other companies to operate franchises, and by corporate ownership. The first store outside the United States was opened at The Dubai Mall in August 2012 as a franchise via a licensing agreement.

On January 25, 2011, the company expanded into the Middle East in a partnership with Kuwaiti retail franchising company M.H. Alshaya Co. The 300-seat restaurant opened on August 16, 2012, at The Dubai Mall. This is The Cheesecake Factory's first location outside the United States.

In May 2014, The Cheesecake Factory announced that they would open the first Cheesecake Factory in East Asia. The first East Asian Cheesecake Factory opened in Disneytown in Pudong, Shanghai, China on June 16, 2016.

Also in 2014, the first Cheesecake Factory in Mexico opened its doors in Guadalajara.

As of May 2018, The Cheesecake Factory has eleven restaurants in the Middle East: four in Dubai (Dubai Mall, Mall of Emirates, Jumeirah Beach Residence and Dubai Festival City Mall), three in Kuwait (Arabella, Sidra, and Avenues Mall—which was the 160th Cheesecake Factory opening), two in Saudi Arabia (Riyadh and Jeddah), and lastly one in the Yas Mall and one in The Galleria in Abu Dhabi. On December 1, 2015, The Cheesecake Factory opened its eighth Middle East branch at the Verdun Shopping Center in Beirut, Lebanon. The opening was attended by many of The Cheesecake Factory management including managers from the US and Dubai. The Cheesecake Factory also made its first appearance in Doha, Qatar, by opening in the Mall of Qatar and further opened two more branches in Villaggio and Doha Festival City.

There are Cheesecake Factories in Parque Delta and Centro Santa Fe, Mexico City.

On April 12, 2017, the company announced that it would be expanding into Canada. In November 2017, the first Canadian location opened at Yorkdale Shopping Centre in Toronto, Ontario.

In May 2017, a Hong Kong store opened in Harbour City, Tsim Sha Tsui.

As of the end of 2021, The Cheesecake Factory is open for business in UAE, Kuwait, Saudi Arabia, Qatar, Bahrain, Mexico, the Chinese Mainland, and Special Administrative Regions of Hong Kong and Macau.

Legal issues
On December 4, 2020, the U.S. Securities and Exchange Commission resolved charges brought against The Cheesecake Factory for misleading investors during the COVID-19 pandemic; the company paid a $125,000 fine without admitting the findings in the order.

Other restaurants
The Cheesecake Factory Bakery Cafe operates two bakery production facilities in Calabasas Hills, California and Rocky Mount, North Carolina, and licenses two bakery-based menus to other food service operators. This division operates in North America, Europe, Asia and the Middle East. The Cheesecake Factory Bakery has appointed Schengen Desserts B.V. as their master distributor for UK and Europe.

Grand Lux Cafe

David Overton designed the Grand Lux Cafe, an upscale restaurant for The Venetian hotel and casino in Las Vegas. The restaurant is modeled after Italian, French, and Austrian styles. The Cafe offers, in addition to American and European-style food, Thai, Malaysian, Caribbean cuisine, and others. The Cheesecake Factory operates fourteen Grand Lux Cafe restaurants located in Florida, Georgia,  Illinois, Nevada, New Jersey, New York, Pennsylvania, and Texas.

Each Grand Lux Cafe features an on-site bakery which produces a selection of signature bake-to-order desserts (which take up to 30 minutes), and a full-service craft bar.

RockSugar Southeast Asian Kitchen
RockSugar Southeast Asian Kitchen was a contemporary Asian-fusion restaurant which opened on June 19, 2008, at Century City in Los Angeles. David Overton excluded Chinese and Japanese cuisines from the menu, as these are served at the Grand Lux and Cheesecake Factory restaurants. It closed on December 31, 2020, at least in part to the COVID-19 pandemic. A second location opened in Oakbrook, IL in November 2017, but closed in December 2019.

Fox Restaurant Concepts
On July 31, 2019, the Cheesecake Factory announced it had reached an agreement to buy Phoenix-based Fox Restaurant Concepts (FRC) for $308 million in cash at closing and another $45 million due over the course of the next four years. FRC started off in 1998 when 21 year old founder Sam Fox launched his first restaurant concept Wildflower (unrelated to another Arizona restaurant Wildflower Bread Company) and has since launched additional restaurants in differing categories including North Italia, a specialty restaurant known for pasta, pizza, and other Italian foods. North Italia alone currently has locations in Arizona, California, Colorado, Florida, Kansas, Nevada, North Carolina, Pennsylvania, Tennessee, Texas, Virginia, and Washington, D.C. Other concepts from the FRC portfolio include: Flower Child, Culinary Dropout, Blanco, The Henry, Zinburger, The Arrogant Butcher, Doughbird, The Green House, Olive & Ivy and The Rocket.

Menu

The Cheesecake Factory dining menu includes steaks, chops, burgers, chicken, seafood, sandwiches, pasta, soups and salads in various cuisines. In addition to their regular dining menu, the company offers a lower-calorie menu that includes salads, burgers, sandwiches and small plates. The brunch menu is offered on Saturdays and Sundays and includes pancakes, waffles, French toast, and eggs. 

The dessert menu offers 35 cheesecake flavors in addition to cakes, milkshakes and specialty and ice cream desserts.

The more than 250 menu items are all made from scratch to order.

Caloric content
The Cheesecake Factory has been criticized for featuring large servings of high-calorie and high-fat foods, and a corresponding lack of healthy menu options. For these reasons, the chain was dubbed the "worst family restaurant in America" for 2010 by Men's Health magazine. The average sandwich at the restaurant contains 1,400 calories. In 2013, the Center for Science in the Public Interest gave a better understanding toward some of the food found at The Cheesecake Factory, including the "Crispy Chicken Costoletta" that has more calories (2,610) than a 12-piece bucket of fried chicken from KFC and The Cheesecake Factory's "Bistro Shrimp Pasta" dish, which had more calories than any other entrée from a national chain restaurant at 3,120 calories, with 89 grams of saturated fat. The United States Department of Agriculture's Center for Nutrition Policy and Promotion states in its dietary guidelines that a typical female adult should consume about 2,000 calories (males 2,500) and no more than 10% of saturated fat per day. In an attempt to offer healthier, lower-calorie meal options, The Cheesecake Factory created a "Skinnylicious" menu that features a variety of cocktails, salads, appetizers, and specialty dishes such as lemon-garlic shrimp and grilled salmon.

COVID-19 pandemic

On March 18, 2020, Overton informed his landlords that his restaurants will be unable to pay rent for the month of April due to significant financial losses as a result of the COVID-19 pandemic, but will resume paying rents as soon as possible and the restaurants reopened after the COVID-19 pandemic in 2020.

In popular culture
On The Big Bang Theory, Penny and Bernadette worked at The Cheesecake Factory before meeting their respective husbands Leonard and Howard. The eatery served as the gang's hangout when not in the lunchroom at Caltech.

The Cheesecake Factory is parodied in the Nickelodeon show iCarly as The Cheesecake Warehouse.

The Cheesecake Factory was referenced in the American film Step Brothers.

In The Spy Who Dumped Me, Audrey tells Morgan that she and Drew went to The Cheesecake Factory, to which Morgan replies: "God, that menu. Too many options."

In the 2016 Drake song "Child's Play", the lyrics say, "Why you gotta fight with me at Cheesecake? You know I love to go there," making reference to Drake's love for The Cheesecake Factory.

In The Simpsons episode "Bart Sells His Soul", one of the dining options in Springfield was "The Texas Cheesecake Depository".

During the 2022 holiday season, The Cheesecake Factory aired radio commercials where the song “Twinkle, Twinkle, Little Star” could clearly be heard in the background, a practice also done by Omaha Steaks.

See also

 List of restaurant chains

References

External links

Restaurants in Greater Los Angeles
Restaurant chains in the United States
Companies based in Calabasas, California
Restaurants established in 1978
1978 establishments in California
Companies listed on the Nasdaq
The Big Bang Theory